The following is a list of the 17 cantons of the Nièvre department, in France, following the French canton reorganisation which came into effect in March 2015:

 La Charité-sur-Loire
 Château-Chinon
 Clamecy
 Corbigny
 Cosne-Cours-sur-Loire
 Decize
 Fourchambault
 Guérigny
 Imphy
 Luzy
 Nevers-1
 Nevers-2
 Nevers-3
 Nevers-4
 Pouilly-sur-Loire
 Saint-Pierre-le-Moûtier
 Varennes-Vauzelles

References